9.0 may refer to:
9 (disambiguation)
9.0: Live